Nereta is a river of  Biržai district municipality, Panevėžys County, northern Lithuania and Southern Latvia.

It is a right tributary of the Nemunėlis.

References

Rivers of Latvia
Rivers of Lithuania
Biržai District Municipality
Latvia–Lithuania border